NGC 2525 is a barred spiral galaxy located in the constellation Puppis. It is located at a distance of about 70 million light years from Earth, which, given its apparent dimensions, means that NGC 2525 is about 60,000 light years across. It was discovered by William Herschel on February 23, 1791.

The galaxy has a bar and two main spiral arms with high surface brightness. HII regions are observed in the arms. The brightest stars of the galaxy have apparent magnitude around 22. Its nucleus is small and bright. In the centre of the galaxy is predicted to lie a supermassive black hole whose age is estimated to be between 1.1 and 44 million years, based on the spiral arm pitch angle.

SN 2018gv

One supernova has been observed in NGC 2525, SN 2018gv. It was discovered on 15 January 2018 at magnitude 16.5, and it was identified spectrographically as a type Ia supernova 10 to 15 days before maximum. The supernova was also observed by ATLAS on 2018 January 14.5 UT at magnitude 18.1. It reached a peak magnitude of 12.8. A video of the supernova was released.

References

External links 

NGC 2525 on SIMBAD

Barred spiral galaxies
Puppis
2525
UGCA objects
22721
Astronomical objects discovered in 1791
Discoveries by William Herschel